Ahmed Rateb (‎; 23 January 1949 – 14 December 2016) was an Egyptian actor. He appeared in more than sixty films.

Selected filmography

See also
Cinema of Egypt
Lists of Egyptian films

References

External links 

1949 births
2016 deaths
Egyptian male film actors
Male actors from Cairo